The Chop Tops were a rockabilly trio from Santa Cruz, California consisting of Sinner (vocals/standing drums), Shelby (guitar), and Josh (upright bass). The band was formed by Sinner in 1995, Shelby joined in 1999, and Josh took over bass duties in 2014. The band coined the phrase "Revved-Up Rockabilly" to describe their wild, upbeat blend of rockabilly, psychobilly, old punk, teddy boy, and surf music genres. The Chop Tops headlined their own national tours, toured with bands like Mad Sin and the Nekromantix, and opened for many bands including the Dead Kennedys, Suicidal Tendencies, Dick Dale, John Lee Hooker, and Chuck Berry.

Other accomplishments included having three of their songs featured in the video game WET, performing at several Warped Tours, and many years of playing the annual rockabilly festival Viva Las Vegas. In April 2012, the band made their first international tour appearing at dates across Australia (they were asked back and returned for another Australian tour in June 2013). The Chop Tops were sponsored by Murray's Pomade.
Murray's has sponsored only two bands in its 90-year history, the Stray Cats and the Chop Tops. The group was also sponsored and endorsed by Gretsch guitars, Jim Dunlop, and T.U.K. shoes.

The Chop Tops made their final appearance on April 3, 2015, at the 18th annual Viva Las Vegas Rockabilly Weekender. The band was joined by guest performers Chantilly Lace Vincent (granddaughter of Gene Vincent) and Mario Valens (Ritchie Valens' younger brother).

Discography
Revved-Up Rockabilly (1997) Swillbilly Music
Tales of Hot Rods, Hot Broads & Lucky Odds! (1999) Swillbilly Music, Producer: Deke Dickerson
Always Wild (2000) Rollin' Rock Records
Evil Six (2001) Swillbilly Music
Triple Deuces (2006) Split 7 Records
Deadly Love (2010) Swillbilly Music, Producer & Assistant Engineer: Kim Nekroman, Mastered by Maor Appelbaum
Evil Six: Revisited (2012) Swillbilly Music

Compilation albums
Good Rockin’ Tonight! Volumes I & II (2000) Purist Records
Someday Coming Down: A Deviant Twang Sampler (2004) Warning Sign Records
Hicks with Sticks – A Town North Of Bakersfield (2005) Cracked Piston Recordings
Return Of The Hot Rod Zombies (2005) Split 7 Records
Clash of The Billys Rumble #1 (2007) Terror .45 Records
Revenge Of The Hot Rod Zombies (2008) Boss Beat
Rebels of Rock 'N' Roll, Vol. 1 (2008) Straight Razor Records
Rebels of Rock N Roll No. 2 (2009) Straight Razor Records

Film appearance
Flying Saucer Rock 'N' Roll (2006)

References

External links

Rockabilly music groups
American psychobilly musical groups
American musical trios
Musical groups established in 1995